The men's 100 metres event at the 2002 African Championships in Athletics was held in Radès, Tunisia on August 6–7.

Medalists

Results

Heats
Wind:Heat 1: +2.4 m/s, Heat 2: +2.1 m/s, Heat 3: +2.6 m/s, Heat 4: +0.7 m/s, Heat 5: +2.3 m/s

Semifinals
Wind:Heat 1: +1.9 m/s, Heat 2: +1.2 m/s (or +2.1 m/s), Heat 3: +2.6 m/s

Final
Wind: +3.8 m/s

References

2002 African Championships in Athletics
100 metres at the African Championships in Athletics